The Kawasaki Ki-91 was a Japanese heavy bomber developed by Kawasaki Aircraft Industries during the later years of World War II.

Development
In early 1943, following the cancellation of the Nakajima Ki-68 and Kawanishi Ki-85 due to the failure of the Nakajima G5N, Kawasaki responded to the Imperial Japanese Army's requirement for a long-range bomber of similar size and performance to the B-29 Superfortress with the Ki-91. Like the G5N, Ki-68, and Ki-85, the Ki-91 was to be capable of launching attacks on the continental US from Japan. In April 1944, a wooden mockup was built for inspection, and by May production of the first prototype was ordered. Construction of the prototype began in June, but the first B-29 raids on Japan were underway beginning that month. In February 1945, the first Ki-91 prototype was 60 percent complete when a B-29 air raid damaged the facility in Gifu Prefecture where the Ki-91 prototype was being built, bringing the program to a halt.

Design
The Ki-91 was a design for a heavy bomber similar in size and bombload to the B-29 Superfortress and Consolidated B-32. It had a bigger wingspan and fuselage than the B-29 and B-32, and featured a pressurized cabin to allow high altitude flights. The prototype was to lack a pressurized cabin, but production aircraft were to be built with the pressurized cabin.

Specifications

See also
 Amerikabomber

References

Further reading
 
 

Ki-91
1940s Japanese bomber aircraft
Four-engined tractor aircraft
World War II Japanese bombers
Four-engined piston aircraft